Josecarlos Van Rankin Galland (born 14 May 1993) is a Mexican professional footballer who plays as a right-back for Liga MX club Necaxa.

Club career

Youth
Van Rankin joined the youth academy of UNAM in 2010. After continuing through Pumas UNAM Youth Academy successfully going through UNAM Premier, Pumas Morelos, U-17, and U-20. He finally reached the first team, Juan Antonio Torres being the coach promoting Van Rankin to first team.

UNAM
Van Rankin made his Liga MX debut as a second-half substitute for Érik Vera in a 2–1 loss against Club América on 19 March 2012.

Guadalajara (loan)
He would join Guadalajara on loan. He would make his debut with the team on 21 July 2018, managing to score his team's only goal at the 59th minute in a 2–1 loss against Tijuana. On 30 September 2018, he would contribute an assist to Alan Pulido to score the first goal in the Súper Clásico against América at the 59th minute, eventually concluding with a score of 1–1.

Portland Timbers (loan)
On 3 February 2021, Van Rankin joined Major League Soccer side Portland Timbers on loan for the 2021 season. Following the 2022 season, his purchase option was declined by Portland.

International career

Youth
Van Rankin participated with the under-20 team that won the 2013 CONCACAF U-20 Championship, starting in all 5 games where Mexico was the eventual winner. He was on listed on the Best Eleven of the tournament.

Senior
Van Rankin was called up for the first time to the senior national team by interim coach Ricardo Ferretti for October friendlies against Costa Rica and Chile. He would make his national team debut on 11 October 2018 in a 3–2 win against Costa Rica, responsible for an assist to Víctor Guzmán for the first Mexico goal and contributing a handball for an opposing penalty.

Career statistics

International

Personal life
Van Rankin's sister is actress Mariana Van Rankin and his uncle is actor and television host Jorge van Rankin. Van Rankin also holds a passport for the Netherlands.

Honours
Mexico Youth
CONCACAF U-20 Championship: 2013
Pan American Silver Medal: 2015
CONCACAF Olympic Qualifying Championship: 2015

Individual
CONCACAF U-20 Championship Best XI: 2013

References

External links 
 
 
 

1993 births
Living people
Mexico under-20 international footballers
Footballers from Mexico City
Mexican people of Dutch descent
Mexican people of French descent
Club Universidad Nacional footballers
Liga MX players
Footballers at the 2015 Pan American Games
Association football fullbacks
Pan American Games medalists in football
Pan American Games silver medalists for Mexico
Mexican footballers
Medalists at the 2015 Pan American Games
Portland Timbers players
Mexico international footballers
Major League Soccer players